The 2001 Women's European Cricket Championship was an international cricket tournament held in England from 10 to 12 August 2001. It was the sixth edition of the Women's European Championship, and, for the final time, all matches at the tournament held One Day International (ODI) status.

Four teams participated, with the hosts, England, joined by Ireland, the Netherlands, and Scotland. Denmark, which had participated in every prior edition, did not send a team, while Scotland was making both its tournament debut and its ODI debut. England, the winner of the past five editions of the tournament, selected only players under the age of 19 in its squad, although all the team's matches were granted official status. Ireland won all of its round-robin matches to claim its first title. As at the previous tournament in 1999, no final was played, although both England and Ireland were undefeated going into their final match, making that a de facto final. England's Laura Harper and Ireland's Isobel Joyce led the tournament in runs and wickets, respectively. All matches at the tournament were played at Bradfield College, Reading.

Squads

Points table

Source: CricketArchive

Fixtures

Statistics

Most runs
The top five run scorers (total runs) are included in this table.

Source: CricketArchive

Most wickets

The top five wicket takers are listed in this table, listed by wickets taken and then by bowling average.

Source: CricketArchive

References

1999
International women's cricket competitions in England
2001 in English cricket
2001 in women's cricket
cricket
cricket
cricket
Wom
International cricket competitions in 2001
August 2001 sports events in the United Kingdom